Carole Madeleine Kaboud Mebam (born 17 September 1978) is a Cameroonian athlete who specializes in the 100 and 400 metres hurdles.

Achievements

Personal bests
100 metres hurdles – 13.71 s (2008)
400 metres hurdles – 56.90 s (2008) – national record

She also holds the national record in 4 × 400 metres relay with 3:27.08 minutes, achieved together with teammates Mirelle Nguimgo, Delphine Atangana and Hortense Béwouda in August 2003 in Paris.

References

External links
 

1976 births
Living people
Cameroonian female hurdlers
Athletes (track and field) at the 2004 Summer Olympics
Athletes (track and field) at the 2008 Summer Olympics
Olympic athletes of Cameroon
Athletes (track and field) at the 2002 Commonwealth Games
Athletes (track and field) at the 2006 Commonwealth Games
Athletes (track and field) at the 2010 Commonwealth Games
Commonwealth Games competitors for Cameroon
African Games bronze medalists for Cameroon
African Games medalists in athletics (track and field)
Athletes (track and field) at the 2003 All-Africa Games
Competitors at the 2001 Summer Universiade
20th-century Cameroonian women
21st-century Cameroonian women